Finland competed at the 1994 Winter Olympics in Lillehammer, Norway.

Medalists

Competitors
The following is the list of number of competitors in the Games.

Alpine skiing

Men

Biathlon

Men

Women

Cross-country skiing

Men

Women

Figure skating

Women

Ice Dancing

Freestyle skiing

Men

Women

Ice hockey

Men's Team Competition

Results

Nordic combined

Ski jumping

References

Official Olympic Reports
International Olympic Committee results database

Nations at the 1994 Winter Olympics
1994
W